The House of Zik (also recorded as House of Zix; Middle Persian: zikan,  Ziks; New Persian: dodmane zik,  Zik family) was an Iranian noble family during the Parthian and Sassanian rule in Iran. The house was from Median origin and was centered in Adurbadagan (modern-day Iranian Azerbaijan). 'Zik' was a 4th-century Iranian officer active during the reign of the Sasanian king (shah) Shapur II from the House of Zik.

References

Sources
 

 
Families from the Sasanian Empire
Iranian noble families